James Otis Henry (April 25, 1903 – February 27, 1975), nicknamed "Tex", was an American Negro league third baseman in the 1930s.

A native of Daingerfield, Texas, Henry made his Negro leagues debut in 1931 with the Memphis Red Sox. He played with Memphis again the following season, and also played for the Indianapolis Athletics in 1937. Henry died in Gladewater, Texas in 1975 at age 71.

References

External links
 and Seamheads

1903 births
1975 deaths
Indianapolis Athletics players
Memphis Red Sox players
20th-century African-American sportspeople
Baseball infielders